In the Jewish classical texts, Atchalta De'Geulah (Aramaic: אתחלתא דגאולה; Hebrew: התחלת הגאולה, Hatchalat ha-Geulah; lit., "the beginning of the redemption") is the period of time in which a new stage of revival in the process of the redemption and the coming of the Jewish Messiah takes place. Hence, a pivotal point in time, since it is the initial stage of the salvation process that constitutes a different period in time, in many senses, and especially different from all previous periods. It is the core idea of the Religious Zionist movement.

Origins in the classical texts
In the Jewish classical texts, from the Gemara and on, one may find many characterizations of the various stages of the redemption. Among the most notable of them are:

Difficulties and sufferings - as is stated: "Let him [The Messiah] come, but let me not see him" - b. Talmud, Tractate Sanhedrin, 98b
Growth of the Plants in the Land of Israel - In the Gemara, it is stated: "There is no more revealed end than this" - b. Talmud, Tractate Sanhedrin, 98a
Jewish reign in the Land of Israel - As the words of the Amora Samuel utters: "There is no difference between this world and the days of the Messiah, except [that in the latter there will be no] bondage of foreign powers" - b. Talmud, Tractate Berakoth, 34b; words that later were ruled to be an Halakhaic law by Maimonides in his work Mishneh Torah
Wars that the People of Israel participate in - "In the sixth year will be thunderings, in the seventh wars, at the end of the seventh, the son of David will come? War is also the Atchalta De'Geulah" - b. Talmud, Tractate Megillah, 17b

Religious Zionist attitude
One of the fathers of the Religious Zionist Movement, a movement whose belief is that redeeming the Land of Israel and the establishment of the state of Israel will bring about the Jewish Messiah, was Rabbi Abraham Isaac HaCohen Kook ("HaRaAYaH"). In numerous references, he called our present times Atchalta De'Geulah. In his epistle from 1918 (תרע"ח; Hebrew calendar), he writes:

HaRaAYaH's son, Zvi Yehuda Kook, one of the main spiritual leaders of the Israeli settlement movement, following R. Judah Loew ben Bezalel (the "Maharal of Prague"), in his work "Lenetivot Israel", reinforces his Atchalta De'Geulah argument for having an agricultural prosperity, which he views with favour, as is stated in the Gemara:

The principal learning textbook of the Religious Zionist movement is the book of R. Menachem Mendel Kasher, HaTekufah HaGedolah ("The Great Era"), in which he explains the meaning of our times, according to the Religious Zionist view. Some additional textbooks that convey this world view are: R. Yitzhak Dadon book, Atchalta Hee ("Atchalta it is"), and R. Ya'akov Moshe Bergman's book, Can the state of Israel be the Atchalta De'Geulah?

Haredi Judaism attitude
Haredi Judaism, in contrast to Religious Zionism, opines that the coming of the Jewish Messiah will bring about the redemption of the Land of Israel and its people (whenever this may occur, and in many different aspects). Still, some of the Haredi community, either outside of Israel or within the state of Israel, work along with The Jewish rule of Israel and its state (in a different annotation), and see the advantages of it. In their view, these are two separate issues, the state of Israel and the coming of the Messiah.

They also claim to distinguish between two concepts of ideas:

Atchalta De'Geulah - the beginning of the redemption [Process]
Ikveta De'Meshicha - the footsteps (or delay) of The Messiah (i. e.: a period of time of crisis and sufferings leading up to the coming of the Jewish Messiah)

The Lubavitcher Rebbe of Chabad, Rabbi Menachem Mendel Schneerson, who was a strong supporter of Israel, opposed the concept of defining the state of Israel as an Atchalta De'Geulah, and claimed that many are killed in Israel due to some who attributed the term Atchalta De'Geulah to the state of Israel, and also, he claimed, it is delaying the "revealed end [times]".

In that conjunction, Prof. Israel Eldad wrote in an article in one of the major Israeli daily newspapers, Yedioth Ahronoth, about the Lubavitcher Rebbe's visit in Israel: "When I tried to bring up the conventional formula of Religious Zionism, that Israel is the Atchalta De'Geulah ... his tone of voice took a sudden turn, he banged on the table with his fist, and retorted: 'Rabbi Kook was wrong ...' It was a separate issue in his mind."

See also
Orthodox Judaism
Religious Zionism
Haredi Judaism
Streams of Zionism
Gathering of Israel
Religion in Israel
Yom HaAliyah

References

Jewish eschatology
Religious Zionism
Talmud concepts and terminology
Aramaic words and phrases
Religion in Israel
Kabbalistic words and phrases
Aramaic words and phrases in Jewish prayers and blessings